Ceratoclasis discodontalis is a moth in the family Crambidae. It was described by George Hampson in 1899. It is found in Costa Rica and Venezuela.

The wingspan is about 28 mm. The forewings are greyish brown with a yellowish tinge. The hindwings are ochreous, suffused with brown.

References

Moths described in 1899
Spilomelinae